Eleonora Serhiyivna Vynnychenko (born 5 September 1993) is a Ukrainian former competitive figure skater. She is a two-time Ukrainian national champion and reached the free skate at two ISU Championships. After retiring from competition, she became a coach in Ukraine and Vietnam.

Programs

Competitive highlights 
JGP: ISU Junior Grand Prix

References

External links 
 

1993 births
Ukrainian female single skaters
Living people
Sportspeople from Dnipro